Thomas Siani (born 5 September 1960) is a Cameroonian former cyclist. He competed in the individual road race event at the 1984 Summer Olympics.

References

External links
 

1960 births
Living people
Cameroonian male cyclists
Olympic cyclists of Cameroon
Cyclists at the 1984 Summer Olympics
Place of birth missing (living people)